Uuno is a Finnish and Estonian male given name, and may refer to:

Uuno Kailas (1901–1933), Finnish poet, author, and translator
Uuno Klami (1900–1961), Finnish composer
Uuno Laakso (1896–1956), Finnish actor
Uuno Montonen (1891–1973), Finnish actor
Uuno Turhapuro, Finnish comedy character created by Spede Pasanen and played by Vesa-Matti Loiri

See also
Uno (given name)

Finnish masculine given names
Estonian masculine given names